The Seaway Stakes is a Thoroughbred horse race run annually in late August or early September at Woodbine Racetrack in Toronto, Ontario, Canada. A Grade III race since 2004, it is open to  dillies and mares aged three and older. Contested over a distance of 7 furlongs on Tapeta synthetic dirt, it carries a purse of Can$150,000.

There was no race run in 1965 and 1966. In 1984 it was run in two divisions.

Inaugurated in 1956, over the years the race has been contested at various distances:
 6 furlongs : 1958-1964
  furlongs : 2006
 7 furlongs : 1956–1957, 1967–2005, 2007

Records
Speed  record:  (Through 1998, times were recorded in fifths of a second . Since 1999 they are in hundredths of a second)
 1:21.51 - Akronism (2008)

Most wins:
 3 - Prospective Dolly (1991, 1992, 1994)

Most wins by an owner:
 4 - Conn Smythe (1970, 1971, 1975, 1976)

Most wins by a jockey:
 6 - Robin Platts (1968, 1972, 1979, 1981, 1984, 1985)

Most wins by a trainer:
 4 - Arthur H. Warner (1961, 1962, 1969, 1983)
 4 - Donnie Walker (1970, 1971, 1975, 1976)

Winners of the Seaway Stakes

See also
 List of Canadian flat horse races

References
 The Seaway Stakes at Pedigree Query
The 2007 Seaway Stakes at the NTRA

Graded stakes races in Canada
Sprint category horse races for fillies and mares
Recurring sporting events established in 1956
Woodbine Racetrack
1956 establishments in Ontario